The European Gendarmerie Force (EUROGENDFOR) is an operational, pre-organised, and rapidly deployable intervention force, exclusively comprising elements of several European police forces with military status of the Parties in order to perform all police tasks within the scope of crisis management operations, as established by Art.1 of the Treaty establishing the European Gendarmerie Force.

It was launched by an agreement in 2006 between five member states of the European Union (EU): France, Italy, the Netherlands, Portugal, and Spain. Romania joined in 2009; Poland in 2011. Its status is enshrined in the Treaty of Velsen of 18 October 2007. The headquarters are located in Vicenza, Italy.

It is presently not established at the EU level (referred to as the Common Security and Defence Policy, CSDP); it is for instance not a project of the Permanent Structured Cooperation (PESCO) of the CSDP. It may however contribute in the implementation of the CSDP, when made available as a multinational force in accordance with article 42.3 of the Treaty on European Union (TEU).

History
The French Defence Minister Michèle Alliot-Marie first proposed the force in September 2003. Alliot-Marie and the Italian Defense Minister Antonio Martino presented the idea at the Meeting of European Union Defense Ministers in October 2003. The implementation agreement was finally signed by defence ministers of the five participating countries on 17 September 2004 in Noordwijk, Netherlands. On 23 January 2006, the EGF was officially inaugurated during a military ceremony in the Gen. Chinotto barracks in Vicenza.

EUROGENDFOR was declared fully operational on 20 July 2006, following the High Level Interministerial meeting in Madrid, Spain, and its second successful Command Post exercise (CPX), which took place between 19 and 28 April 2006. The first CPX was held at the National Gendarmerie Training Center in Saint Astier, France in June 2005.

After Romania's accession to the European Union, the Romanian Gendarmerie sought permanent observer status with the European Gendarmerie Force, as a first step towards full membership. On March 3, 2009, the Romanian Gendarmerie became a full member of the European Gendarmerie Force.

The Polish Military Gendarmerie was originally a partner force and, on 10 October 2006, Poland indicated it would like to join the EGF. In December 2011, Poland applied for full membership in EGF, which was granted in 2011.

Missions

Since December 2009, the EGF has taken part in the NATO International Security Assistance Force (ISAF) training operation of the Afghan National Police (ANP) in the War in Afghanistan. As of June 2010, 276 members of the EGF (among which 124 French gendarmes), from France, Spain, Netherlands, Poland, Romania and Portugal are training the Afghan National Civil Order Police (ANCOP) officers and non-commissioned officers, while the initial mission was planned to be around 400 to 500 men. They are training them in ANCOP training centers but are also accompanying, advising and helping them during their missions in P-OMLT (Police Operational Mentoring and Liaison Teams), where their military experience (even if the mission is strictly speaking, civilian) will be useful. As of May 2010, it had trained 50 officers and 250 non-commissioned officers of the ANCOP, and the then French Minister of Defense Brice Hortefeux announced that 40 more French gendarmes would be sent to help this mission.

In early 2010, the EGF was deployed to Haiti to help with post-relief security efforts.

Structure

EUROGENDFOR is based in Vicenza, in northeastern Italy, and has a core of 800 to 900 members ready to deploy within 30 days.

An additional 2,300 reinforcements are available on standby.

Commanders

Members
The treaty allows for any EU member state to become a European Gendarmerie Force member state, subject to the approval of existing European Gendarmerie Force members.  The member forces are:

Germany does not take part, as its constitution does not permit the use of military forces for police services. In 2004, Peter Struck, Minister of Defense at the time, clarified that the legal foundation for militarised police forces is different from the expectations underlying the EGF. The paramilitary Bereitschaftspolizei units of the Länder states have no standing patrol order like the German Federal Police. Germany did not sign the Treaty of Velsen on the EGF or any subsequent accord. Instead, there is a tight integration of police forces based on the Prüm Treaty. Originally the Prüm Treaty regulated access to police databases of neighboring countries but it was used multiple times as the legal foundation to exchange riot police equipment and personnel with the participating countries (Germany, Spain, France, Luxembourg, Netherlands, Austria, and Belgium). In 2008 the Prüm Treaty was naturalised as EU law, allowing countries access to police forces regulated under EU law (based on the Schengen Agreement). The European Police Forces Training of 2009 (EUPFT 2009) was run in Vicenza (home of EGF headquarters) and the EUPFT 2010 on anti-riot tactics was run in Lehnin in Germany.

Partners
  Lithuanian Public Security Service

Observers
  Turkish Gendarmerie

Relationship with EU defence policy
The EGF has been widely misrepresented, notably with regard to its general purpose and specific relationship to the EU. The EGF is not an EU body, and has no power to intervene on the soil of the EU and its Member States, including the EGF countries.

The EGF is presently not established at the EU level (referred to as the Common Security and Defence Policy, CSDP); it is for instance not a project of the Permanent Structured Cooperation (PESCO) of the CSDP. The EGF may however contribute in the implementation of the CSDP, when made available as a multinational force in accordance with article 42.3 of the Treaty on European Union (TEU).

See also
Association of the European and Mediterranean Police Forces and Gendarmeries with Military Status
Common Security and Defence Policy
EU Battlegroup
Eurocorps
European Maritime Force

Notes

References

External links

International organizations based in Europe
Gendarmerie
Organizations established in 2006
2006 in the European Union